Pico de Teyra is a mountain  above sea level, located in the state of Zacatecas (highest of this state) in Mexico.

References

Mountains of Mexico